Rossiya Tournament 1982 was played in Syktyvkar on 6–9 February 1982. The Soviet union won the tournament.

The tournament was decided by round-robin results like a group stage.

Results

Sources 
 Norges herrlandskamper i bandy 
 Sverige-Sovjet i bandy 
 Rossija Tournament 

1982 in Soviet sport
1982 in bandy
1982